Lambertseter Upper Secondary School is a public upper secondary school located in the district of Nordstrand in Oslo, Norway. The school was established in 1961 and offers general academics (the college preparatory studiespesialisering of the Norwegian school system) and sports studies. The school also has a special section for severely multihandicapped students. It currently has a total of about 855 students and 100 employees.

External links 
 
 School information in English

Secondary schools in Norway
Schools in Oslo
Educational institutions established in 1961
1961 establishments in Norway
Oslo Municipality